Murder Me, Monster is a 2018 Argentine horror film directed by Alejandro Fadel. A co-production with companies in Chile and France, it was screened in the Un Certain Regard section at the 2018 Cannes Film Festival.

References

External links
 

2018 films
2018 drama films
2018 horror films
Argentine horror films
2010s Spanish-language films
French horror films
French speculative fiction films
French independent films
Argentine independent films
2010s Argentine films
2010s French films